Albert Gallatin Dow (August 16, 1808 Plainfield, then in Cheshire Co., now in Sullivan County, New Hampshire – May 23, 1908) was an American merchant, banker and politician from New York.

Life
He was the son of Solomon Dow (died 1822) and Phebe Dow. The family removed to Hartland, Vermont, in 1811; and to a farm about nine miles from Batavia, New York in 1816. He attended the common schools, and then became a store clerk. In 1827, he removed to Panama, and the next year to Silver Creek where he ran first a shoe and leather shop, then a hardware store. On October 4, 1829, he married Freelove Mason (1806–1847), and they had five children.

In 1845, he removed to Randolph, and ran there a dry-goods store and a hardware store. On April 23, 1850, he married Lydia Ann Mason (1814–1891), a sister of his first wife, and they had a son. From 1860 on, he engaged in banking, and from 1881 to 1890 was President of the First National Bank of Salamanca.

He entered politics as a Democrat, became a War Democrat at the beginning of the American Civil War, and remained a Republican thereafter. He was Supervisor of the Town of Randolph in 1851, 1853, 1856 to 1859, and 1862; a member of the New York State Assembly (Cattaraugus Co., 2nd D.) in 1863 and 1864; and a member of the New York State Senate (32nd D.) in 1874 and 1875.

He died on May 23, 1908, aged 99 and was buried at the Randolph Cemetery.

Sources
 Biographical Sketches of the State Officers and the Members of the Legislature of the State of New York in 1862 and '63 by William D. Murphy (1863)
 Life Sketches of Government Officers and Members of the Legislature of the State of New York in 1875 by W. H. McElroy and Alexander McBride (pg. 57f) [e-book]
 The New York Civil List compiled by Franklin Benjamin Hough, Stephen C. Hutchins and Edgar Albert Werner (1870; pg. 497 and 499)
 Albert Gallatin Dow (1808–1908) (e-book)

External links

1808 births
1908 deaths
Republican Party New York (state) state senators
Republican Party members of the New York State Assembly
People from Randolph, New York
People from Plainfield, New Hampshire
Town supervisors in New York (state)
American bankers
People from Silver Creek, New York
19th-century American politicians
19th-century American businesspeople